The Minister of Economic Development and Official Languages is a Minister of the Crown in the Canadian Cabinet. The minister is responsible for Canada's six regional development agencies: the Atlantic Canada Opportunities Agency, the Canadian Northern Economic Development Agency, the Economic Development Agency of Canada for the Regions of Quebec, the Federal Economic Development Agency for Southern Ontario, the Federal Economic Development Initiative for Northern Ontario, and Western Economic Diversification Canada.

List of ministers

References

Economic Development and Official Languages